Maranhãozinho is a Brazilian municipality in the state of Maranhão. Its population is 16,511 (2020) and its area is 761 km2.

References

Municipalities in Maranhão